Fatih Bakir (born 11 March 1977) is a Turkish wrestler. He competed in the men's Greco-Roman 130 kg at the 2000 Summer Olympics.

References

External links
 

1977 births
Living people
Turkish male sport wrestlers
Olympic wrestlers of Turkey
Wrestlers at the 2000 Summer Olympics
Place of birth missing (living people)
20th-century Turkish people
21st-century Turkish people